Leo Francis Murphy (7 August 1909 – 5 April 1999) was an Australian rules footballer who played for Hawthorn in the VFL during the 1930s. He was the father of Fitzroy great John Murphy, and grandfather of Carlton's Marc Murphy; the trio was the first father-son-grandson combination in VFL/AFL history to have each played 100 games.

Murphy was a defender and played originally on the half back flank and the back pocket before moving to fullback. He won Hawthorn's 'Best and Fairest' award in 1936 and 1937, the first player from the club to go back to back.

Honours and achievements
Individual
 2× Hawthorn best and fairest: 1936, 1937
 Hawthorn life member

References

External links

1909 births
1999 deaths
Australian rules footballers from Melbourne
Hawthorn Football Club players
Peter Crimmins Medal winners
Heidelberg Football Club players
People from Heidelberg, Victoria